Melinder Kaur Bhullar (born 1992) in Kuala Lumpur, Malaysia is a Malaysian model. She is also a beauty pageant titleholder. In 2013 she became the first Malaysian to be placed in the Multimedia Awards title in Miss World 2013, where she was placed as 4th Runner-up in that award.

Career

Miss World Malaysia 2013
In 2013, Bhullar was crowned as Miss World Malaysia 2013 and succeeded Yvonne Lee. She beat other fifteen contestants from different states. In the competition, she won the subsidiary title, Miss Beautiful Eyes and Miss Wacoal.

Miss World 2013
Bhullar represented Malaysia in Miss World 2013 in Bali, Indonesia. Although she was considered one of the dark horses in that year, she did not placed, she but won the Multimedia Award as the fourth runner-up.

References

Malaysian people of Indian descent
Malaysian people of Punjabi descent
Living people
People from Kuala Lumpur
Malaysian beauty pageant winners
Miss World 2013 delegates
1992 births
Malaysian Sikhs